The 1985 San Diego State Aztecs football team represented San Diego State University during the 1985 NCAA Division I-A football season as a member of the Western Athletic Conference (WAC).

The team was led by head coach Doug Scovil, in his fifth and last year, and played home games at Jack Murphy Stadium> in San Diego, California. They finished with a record of five wins, six losses and one tie (5–6–1, 3–4–1 WAC).

Schedule

Team players in the NFL
The following were selected in the 1986 NFL Draft.

The following finished their college career in 1985, were not drafted, but played in the NFL.

Team awards

Notes

References

San Diego State
San Diego State Aztecs football seasons
San Diego State Aztecs football